The 1945–46 SK Rapid Wien season was the 48th season in club history.

Squad

Squad and statistics

Squad statistics

Fixtures and results

League

Cup

References

1945-46 Rapid Wien Season
Rapid
Austrian football championship-winning seasons